Zelinskiy is a lunar impact crater that is located on the far side of the Moon. It lies nestled along the northern edge of Mare Ingenii, with the oddly shaped crater Van de Graaff along the east rim and the lava-flooded crater Thomson within one crater diameter to the south.

This crater is somewhat elliptical, having an outwardly bulging rim to the east. Many parts of the rim have not been significantly eroded by impacts, although a small crater lies along the inner wall at the north end of the interior floor. The floor is relatively level in the south and west, with some irregularities in the surface to the northeast.

Satellite craters
By convention these features are identified on lunar maps by placing the letter on the side of the crater midpoint that is closest to Zelinskiy.

Zelinskiy Y lies within Zelinskiy itself, along the northern margin.

References

 
 
 
 
 
 
 
 
 
 
 
 

Impact craters on the Moon